13ème Rue is a television channel specialising in action and suspense shows and movies. It is owned by NBCUniversal.

History

The channel began broadcasting on 13 November 1997 at 20:13 on Canal Satellite channel 13, after several days of broadcasting hook-ups. After a welcome trailer, the broadcast of the first episodes of two unpublished series New York Undercover and American Gothic began.

On November 12, 2007, 13e Rue HD began broadcasting. Since 2 September 2013, 13e Rue broadcasts in 16:9.

Programming 
 100 Code
 Against the Wall 
 Aquarius
 Bates Motel
 Battlestar Galactica
 Burn Notice
 Candice Renoir
 Cape Town
 Castle
 Catching Milat
 Chance
 Cherif
 Chicago Fire
 Chicago Justice
 CHiPS
 Chosen
 Condor
 Coyote
 Cracked
 Departure
 Dig
 EZ Streets
 F/X: The Series
 Fairly Legal
 Ghost Stories
 Hannibal
 High Incident
 In Plain Sight
 Joan of Arcadia
 Karen Sisco
 Kindred: The Embraced 
 Knight Rider
 Kojak
 L.A. Heat
 Law & Order 
 Law & Order: Criminal Intent 
 Law & Order: Los Angeles
 Law & Order: Special Victims Unit 
 Law & Order: Organized Crime 
 Law & Order: Trial by Jury 
 Law & Order True Crime
 Life
 Lucifer
 Magnum 
 Major Crimes 
 Mammon
 Mannix
 Miami Vice
 Midnight Caller
 Midsomer Murders
 Missing (2012)
 Modus
 Motive
 Mr. & Mrs. Smith
 My Life is Murder
 Mysterious Ways
 Navarro
 New York Undercover
 Night Visions
 Perversions of Science
 Played
 Players
 Psych
 Quantum Leap
 ReGenesis
 Rookie Blue 
 She Spies 
 Shoot the Messenger 
 Shooter
 Sliders
 State of Affairs
 Tales from the Crypt 
 Tequila and Bonetti 
 The A-Team
 The Burning Zone
 The Bridge
 The Chicago Code
 The Fall
 The Family
 The Hunger
 The Listener 
 The Outer Limits
 The Shield
 The Twilight Zone
 Third Watch
 True Justice
 Veronica Mars
 Wicked City
 Zen

Audience share
In 2011, 13ème Rue receives 0.6% audience on cable, ADSL and satellite. 13ème Rue is the first cable and satellite channel in terms of viewing time per viewer and is maintained in the five most watched channels, all targets combined.

On Canalsat, 13ème Rue achieved 1.1% audience.

Distribution
In December 2016, SFR announced that it had signed an exclusivity agreement with NBCUniversal and resumed exclusive distribution of Syfy and 13ème Rue, available exclusively on Canal offers.
 
Since then, the channels have arrived at SFR, and were removed of Canal on 26 September 2017.

References

External links
 

Television stations in France
French-language television stations
Television channels and stations established in 1997
1997 establishments in France
Universal Networks International